Ripley Historic District may refer to:
Ripley Historic District (Ripley, Mississippi), listed on the National Register of Historic Places (NRHP)
Ripley Historic District (Ripley, Ohio), listed on the NRHP in Brown County, Ohio
Ripley Historic District (Ripley, West Virginia), NRHP-listed